The 2011–12 Northern Counties East Football League season was the 30th in the history of Northern Counties East Football League, a football competition in England.

Premier Division

The Premier Division featured 17 clubs which competed in the previous season, along with three new clubs:
Barton Town Old Boys, promoted from Division One
Retford United, demoted from the Northern Premier League
Staveley Miners Welfare, promoted from Division One

League table

Division One

Division One featured 16 clubs which competed in the previous season, along with four new clubs:
Albion Sports, promoted from the West Riding County Amateur League
Dinnington Town, relegated from the Premier Division
Hallam, relegated from the Premier Division
Sheffield Parramore, promoted from the Central Midlands League, who also changed name to Worksop Parramore

League table

References

External links
 Northern Counties East Football League

2011-12
9